Maswa District is one of the five districts of the Simiyu Region of Tanzania Inhabited by Sukuma (Nyantuzu People). It is bordered to the north by Magu District and Itilima District, to the east by the Meatu District, to the south by the Kishapu District, and to the west by the Kwimba District. Its administrative centre is the town of Maswa.

According to the 2002 Tanzanian National Census, the population of Maswa District is 304,402.   According to the 2012 Tanzania National Census, the population of Maswa District was 344,125.

Transport
The highway that connects Shinyanga Region and Mara Region (trunk road T36) passes through Maswa town.

The Central Line railway from Tabora to Mwanza passes through the district from south to north and there is one train station within the district's boundaries at the village of Malampaka.

Administrative subdivisions
As of 2012, Maswa District was administratively divided into 26 wards.

Wards

 Badi
 Binza
 Buchambi
 Budekwa
 Busilili
 Dakama
 Ipililo
 Isanga
 Kadoto
 Kulimi
 Lalago
 Malampaka
 Masela
 Mpindo
 Mwamanenge
 Mwamashimba
 Mwang'honoli
 Nguliguli
 Ng'wigwa
 Nyabubinza
 Nyalikungu
 Senani
 Sengwa
 Shishiyu
 Sukuma
 Zanzui

References

 
Districts of Simiyu Region